The 1933 Northeastern Huskies football team represented Northeastern University during the 1933 college football season. It was the program's first-ever season and they finished with a record of 1–3–1. Their head coach was Alfred McCoy and their captain was Brad Johnson. Their only win of the season came during their only away game, while all other games were played at home yet were all losses or a tie.

Schedule

References

Northeastern
Northeastern Huskies football seasons
Northeastern Huskies football